Admiral Richard Laird Warren (1806 – 29 July 1875) was a Royal Navy officer who went on to be Commander-in-Chief, The Nore.

Naval career
Born the son of Admiral Frederick Warren, Warren joined the Royal Navy in 1822. Promoted to Captain in 1839, he commanded HMS Magicienne and then HMS Trincomalee. The Trincomalee was assigned to provide hurricane relief and to search vessels for slave-trade activities on the North American Station.

He also commanded HMS Cressy in the Black Sea during the Crimean War. He was appointed Commander-in-chief, South East Coast of America Station in 1861 and Commander-in-Chief, The Nore in 1869 and retired in 1870.

Family
In 1844 he married Eleanor Charlotte Warren; they had six sons and four daughters.

See also

References

|-

1806 births
1875 deaths
Royal Navy admirals